The House That Love Built is an album by saxophonist Frank Foster which was recorded in Copenhagen in 1982 and released on the SteepleChase label.

Track listing
All compositions by Frank Foster except where noted
 "I Remember Sonny Stitt" – 7:49
 "The House That Love Built" – 7:40
 "John R and Garfield" – 8:13
 "Scandia Skies" (Kenny Dorham) – 9:57 Additional track on CD release
 "Lightly Stroking" – 9:28
 "Dunbar's Delight" – 10:39

Personnel
Frank Foster – tenor saxophone
Horace Parlan – piano
Jesper Lundgaard – double bass
Aage Tanggaard – drums

References

SteepleChase Records albums
Frank Foster (musician) albums
1982 albums